is a Japanese novelist, manga, visual novel writer and anime & movies screenwriter. He is also the chairman of Japanese visual novel studio Minato Soft. He is best known for being the creator of Akame ga Kill! and Yuki Yuna is a Hero.

Works

Manga
Akame ga Kill! (2010-2016)
Akame ga Kill! Zero (2013-2019)
Hinowa ga Crush! (2017-2022)
Chained Soldier (2019)
Hell’s Tormentor Kraken (2022)

Visual novels
Tsuyokiss (Writer; 2005)
Kimi ga Aruji de Shitsuji ga Ore de (Co-writer with Makoto Kanata; 2007)
Maji de Watashi ni Koi Shinasai! (Writer; 2009)
Maji de Watashi ni Koishinasai! S (Writer; 2011)
Maji de Watashi ni Koishinasai! A-set (Writer; 2018)
Anekouji Naoko to Gin'iro no Shinigami (Co-writer with Ou Jackson; 2015)
Kurogane Kaikitan -Sen'ya Ichiya- (Writer; 2015)
Girls Beyond the Wasteland (Writer; 2016)
Waga Himegimi ni Eikan o (Writer; 2021)

Anime
Kimi ga Aruji de Shitsuji ga Ore de (Series composition, Script; 2008) 
Samurai Flamenco (Script; 2013–2014)
Akame ga Kill! (Original creator, Scenario supervisor; 2014)
Yuki Yuna is a Hero (Original creator, Script; 2014)
Girls Beyond the Wasteland (Original creator, 2016)
Yuki Yuna is a Hero: Hero Chapter (Original creator, Script; 2017)
Release the Spyce (Original Creator, Series composition, Script; 2018)
MiniYuri (Series composition, Script; 2019)
World Dai Star (Original creator, Script; 2023)

Original video animations
 15 Bishōjo Hyōryūki (Original creator; 2009) 
YuruYuri (Script; 2019)

Novels
Washio Sumi wa Yūsha de Aru (2014)

Sources:

References

External links
 
Takahiro's blog in Minato Soft official website 

1981 births
Living people
Japanese screenwriters
20th-century Japanese novelists
21st-century Japanese novelists
Anime screenwriters
Hentai creators